The Kalajoki (literally "Fish River") is a  long river in Northern Ostrobothnia, Finland. The river's origin is near Haapajärvi and its mouth is in Kalajoki municipality where the river flows into the Baltic Sea.

External links
 

Rivers of Finland
Drainage basins of the Baltic Sea